The 1973–74 Los Angeles Sharks season was the Los Angeles Sharks' second and final season in Los Angeles in the World Hockey Association. The club finished last in the WHA Western Division and missed the playoffs. They moved to Detroit, MI after the season and became the Michigan Stags.

Offseason
The Sharks lured promising left wing Marc Tardif from the Montreal Canadiens to jump to the Sharks.

Regular season
The Sharks attempted to build on their first season by signing their first bonafide NHL star in the Montreal Canadiens' Marc Tardif. And while the offense featured five 20 goal scorers (Tardif with 40, Gary Veneruzzo with 39, Brian McDonald with 22, and J.P. LeBlanc and Steve Sutherland with 20 apiece), they still ranked last in the league in scoring. The defense was equally porous, falling from 3rd in the league to 11th (next to last). Last year's #1 goalie George Gardner played only 2 games due to injuries, and Russ Gillow suffered from injuries and the "sophomore jinx" as his GAA went from 2.91 in 1972–73 to 3.98 in 1973–74. The other goalies that were brought in didn't fare much better, with Ian Wilkie sporting an unimpressive 3.91 GAA, Jim McLeod at 4.27, and Paul Hoganson even worse with a 4.68 GAA. The special teams, which were solid the season before, also fell on hard times as the power play ranked 9th and the penalty killing went from 3rd in the league to last. The Sharks ended up with the worst record in the league, and endured losing streaks of 9 and 6 games. The only noteworthy item was that they became the first team ever to have no ties (the WHA 10-minute overtime rule helped, but WHA teams still averaged 4 ties per season).

Final standings

Game log

Player stats

Note: Pos = Position; GP = Games played; G = Goals; A = Assists; Pts = Points; +/- = plus/minus; PIM = Penalty minutes; PPG = Power-play goals; SHG = Short-handed goals; GWG = Game-winning goals
      MIN = Minutes played; W = Wins; L = Losses; T = Ties; GA = Goals-against; GAA = Goals-against average; SO = Shutouts;

Awards and records

Transactions
The Sharks' decline in the standings and quality of play was poorly timed in that the NHL's Los Angeles Kings across town were beginning a resurgence that would see them make the playoffs for the next decade. The novelty of the WHA wore off, and attendance dropped measurably. After the 1973-74 season, the Sharks moved to Detroit, MI and became the Michigan Stags.  After 43 games in Detroit MI, the Stags moved to Baltimore and finished out the season as the Baltimore Blades.

Tom Gilmore traded to Edmonton Oilers for Ron Walters, October, 1973.

George Gardner & Ralph MacSweyn traded to Vancouver Blazers for Ron Ward, October, 1973.

Ian Wilkie purchased from Edmonton Oilers, November, 1973.

Mike Hyndman sold to Phoenix Roadrunners(WHL), December, 1973.

Peter Slater sold to Denver Spurs (WHL), December, 1973.

Russ Gillow & Earl Heiskala traded to Jersey Knights for Jim McLeod, January, 1974.

Don Gordon & Jim Watson traded to Chicago Cougars for Bobby Whitlock, February, 1974.

Ron Ward traded to Cleveland Crusaders for Ted Hodgson & Bill Young, February, 1974.

Ian Wilkie traded to Edmonton Oilers for Wayne Zuk, March, 1974.

Draft picks
Los Angeles's draft picks at the 1973 WHA Amateur Draft.

Farm teams

See also
1973–74 WHA season

References

External links

Los Angeles Sharks seasons
Los
Los